Emily Fortune Feimster (born July 1, 1980) is an American writer, comedian, and actress. Having made her television debut on NBC's Last Comic Standing in 2010, Feimster starred as Colette on The Mindy Project (2015–2017). In July 2019, she began hosting  What a Joke with Papa and Fortune with Tom Papa, interviewing comedians and celebrities, the first live programming on the Sirius XM channel Netflix is a Joke. Feimster played Heather in The L Word: Generation Q, a reboot of The L Word.

Early life
Feimster was born in Charlotte, North Carolina, to Mike and Ginger Feimster; 
the youngest of three, with two older brothers, Price and Jay. Fortune is her maternal great-grandmother's maiden name. Growing up in Belmont, North Carolina, she attended Belmont Central Elementary School and Belmont Junior High, subsequently graduating from South Point High School in 1998. That same year, she was presented to society at the Gastonia Debutante Ball. At South Point, she played basketball, softball, and tennis.

She attended Peace College, then a women-only university, and was elected student body president, majored in communications, and played soccer and tennis. She graduated summa cum laude and was the student speaker at commencement in 2002. The graduation speaker was Raleigh native actress Emily Procter, with whom Feimster became acquainted after the graduation.

After living in Spain for a year, she moved to Los Angeles in 2003 to become a personal assistant to Procter and pursue comedy. After connecting with Procter's neighbor, a journalist for the Los Angeles Daily News, Feimster began a seven-year career in entertainment journalism. In 2005, she joined The Groundlings Theatre, studying improv and sketch comedy. After four years, she was selected to join the Groundlings' Sunday Company.

Personal life
Feimster came out as lesbian in 2005 at age 25. In 2016, she began dating kindergarten teacher Jacquelyn Smith,
becoming engaged in early 2018. She and Smith own homes in Los Angeles and Belmont, North Carolina. They married in a small ceremony on Friday, October 23, 2020.

Filmography

Film

Television
 Last Comic Standing (2010) – herself
 After Lately (2011–2013) – herself
 Chelsea Lately (2013–2014) – Round Table Co-host
 2 Broke Girls (2014) – Sherlock Mary
 Workaholics (2014) – Jo
 Mulaney (2014) – Mary Jo
 Glee (2015) – Butch Melman
 Hot Girls Walk By (2015) – Ruth
 Married (2015) – Woman on Rascal
 The Mindy Project (2015–2017) – Collette Kimball-Kinney
 Drunk History (2015) – herself
 Life in Pieces (2016–2019) – Dougie
 Go-Go Boy Interrupted (web series) (2016) – Fortune
 Chelsea (2016) – Ann Coulter
 RuPaul's Drag Race (2017) – herself (S9 E8)
 The Standups in (2017) – herself (S1 E2)
 Chelsea (2017) – Sarah Huckabee Sanders
 Craig of the Creek (2018) – Laura (first voice acting role)
 Summer Camp Island (2018) – Ava (voice acting role)
 Champions (2018) – Ruby
 Claws (2018) – Lauren Zorloni
 The Fix (2018) – herself
 RuPaul's Drag Race (2019) – herself
 Bless the Harts (2019–2021) – Brenda (voice acting role; series regular)
 The Simpsons (2019) – Evelyn (voice acting role)
 Sunnyside (2019) – Michelle Pinholster
 The L Word: Generation Q (2019) – Heather
 Tales of The City (2019) – Carlin
 Sweet and Salty (2020) – herself
Nailed It! (2020) – herself
 Kenan (2021) – Pam Fox
The Circle – The After Party (2021) – herself (co-presenter)
Q-Force (2021) – Louisa Deck (voice acting role)
 RuPaul's Drag Race All Stars (2021) – herself
 Is It Cake? (2022) – herself (judge)
 FUBAR (2023) – Ruth / Roo
 Fortune Feimster: Good Fortune (2023) – herself
 Velma (2023) – Olive (voice acting role)

Podcasts

In addition to hosting her own podcast, Sincerely Fortune, Feimster has appeared on the following:

References

External links
 

Living people
21st-century American actresses
American debutantes
American film actresses
American stand-up comedians
American television actresses
American voice actresses
American women comedians
1980 births
21st-century American comedians
Actresses from North Carolina
William Peace University alumni
American lesbian actresses
Lesbian comedians
LGBT people from North Carolina
Comedians from North Carolina
American LGBT comedians